Newark and Sherwood District Council elections are held every four years. Newark and Sherwood District Council is the local authority for the non-metropolitan district of Newark and Sherwood in Nottinghamshire, England. Since the last boundary changes in 2015, 39 councillors have been elected from 21 wards.

Political control
The first election to the council was held in 1973, initially operating as a shadow authority before coming into its powers on 1 April 1974. Since 1973 political control of the council has been held by the following parties:

Leadership
The leaders of the council since 2003 have been:

Council elections
1973 Newark District Council election
1976 Newark District Council election
1979 Newark District Council election (New ward boundaries)
1983 Newark District Council election
1987 Newark District Council election (Some new ward boundaries & district boundary changes also took place)
1991 Newark District Council election (District boundary changes took place but the number of seats remained the same)
1995 Newark District Council election
1999 Newark and Sherwood District Council election
2003 Newark and Sherwood District Council election (New ward boundaries reduced the number of seats by 8)
2007 Newark and Sherwood District Council election (New ward boundaries)
2011 Newark and Sherwood District Council election
2015 Newark and Sherwood District Council election (New ward boundaries)
2019 Newark and Sherwood District Council election

By-election results

1995-1999

1999-2003

2003-2007

2007-2011

References

By-election results

External links
Newark and Sherwood District Council

 
Newark and Sherwood
Council elections in Nottinghamshire
District council elections in England